Williamsburg Township may refer to one of the following places in the United States:

 Williamsburg Township, Franklin County, Kansas
 Williamsburg Township, Phelps County, Nebraska
 Williamsburg Township, Rockingham County, North Carolina
 Williamsburg Township, Clermont County, Ohio
 Williamsburgh, North Carolina (a former town in Iredell County, North Carolina

See also

Williamsburg (disambiguation)
Williams Township (disambiguation)

Township name disambiguation pages